Tiempo (Spanish: Time) is the second studio album of Argentine pop rock band Erreway. It was released through Sony Music and Cris Morena Group on 15 April 2003 (see 2003 in music). The album was produced by a number of eminent Argentine musicians, including Cris Morena, Carlos Nilson and Andrés Calamaro. Albums Chart and was certified Platinum by CAPIF, the Argentine Phonographic Association.

Erreway members — Camila Bordonaba, Felipe Colombo, Luisana Lopilato and Benjamín Rojas — made a successful Nuestro Tiempo tour to promote the album. Although "Te Soñé" had been released as a single in 2002, before the release of the album, "Tiempo" was released as the lead single. "Será de Dios", "Para Cosas Buenas", "Que Estés" and "Vas A Salvarte" were also released as singles.

Track list 
 "Tiempo" (Cris Morena, Carlos Nilson) — 4:06
 "Será de Dios" (Cris Morena, Silvio Furmansky) — 3:55
 "Para Cosas Buenas" (Cris Morena, Carlos Nilson) — 3:10
 "Dije Adiós" (Cris Morena, Silvio Furmansky) — 4:09
 "Me Da Igual" (Cris Morena, Carlos Nilson) — 3:28
 "Que Estés" (Cris Morena, Carlos Nilson) —3:29
 "No Estés Seguro" (Cris Morena, Carlos Nilson) — 3:13
 "No Se Puede Más" (Cris Morena, Carlos Nilson) — 3:40
 "Te Soñé" (Cris Morena, Carlos Nilson) — 3:00
 "Invento" (Cris Morena, Carlos Nilson) — 3:41
 "Vas a Salvarte" (Cris Morena, Carlos Nilson) — 3:18
 "Vamos Al Ruedo" (Andrés Calamaro) — 3:43

Personnel 
 Erreway
 Camila Bordonaba — vocals
 Felipe Colombo — vocals, guitar
 Luisana Lopilato — vocals
 Benjamín Rojas — vocals
 Rebelde Way cast — backing vocals
 María Cristina de Giácomi, Carlos Nilson, Silvio Furmansky, Andrés Calamaro — producing, composing and songwriting
 Gustavo Novello, Cachorro López — producing

Chart positions and certifications

References

External links 
 Tiempo at Last.fm
 Tiempo at Amazon.com

2003 albums
Erreway albums
Spanish-language albums